Arthur William Wilkie (born 7 October 1942) is an English former footballer who played as a goalkeeper.

Career
Wilkie began his career at Reading, rising up from the youth ranks at the club. In total, Wilkie made 169 Football League for the club. On 31 August 1962, in a match against Halifax Town, Wilkie suffered a back injury. Wilkie was thus utilised as a winger for the rest of the game, scoring twice in a 4–2 win. Following his time at Reading, Wilkie signed for Chelmsford City.

References

1942 births
Living people
Association football goalkeepers
English footballers
Footballers from Woolwich
Reading F.C. players
Chelmsford City F.C. players
English Football League players